Peak wheat is the concept that agricultural production, due to its high use of water and energy inputs, is subject to the same profile as oil and other fossil fuel production.  The central tenet is that a point is reached, the "peak", beyond which agricultural production plateaus and does not grow any further,  and may even go into permanent decline.

Based on current supply and demand factors for agricultural commodities (e.g., changing diets in the emerging economies, biofuels, declining acreage under irrigation, growing global population, stagnant agricultural productivity growth), some commentators are predicting a long-term annual production shortfall of around 2% which, based on the highly inelastic demand curve for food crops, could lead to sustained price increases in excess of 10% a year – sufficient to double crop prices in seven years.

According to the World Resources Institute, global per capita food production has been increasing substantially for the past several decades.

China

Water is a necessary input for food production. Two billion people face acute water shortage this century as Himalayan glaciers melt. Water shortages in China have helped lower the wheat harvest from its peak of 123 million tons in 1997 to below 100 million tons in recent years. But by 2020 production is back to 134Mt, see.
Of China's 617 cities, 300 are facing water shortages. In many, these shortfalls can be filled only by diverting water from agriculture.  Farmers cannot compete economically with industry for water in China.  China is developing a grain deficit even with the over-pumping of its aquifers. Grain production in China has been said to have peaked in 1998 at 392 million tons, falling below 350 million tons in 2000, 2001, and 2002, although such was 571 million tons in 2011 after eight consecutive years of increase from 2003 to 2011. The annual deficits have been filled by drawing down the country's extensive grain reserves, and by reliance on the world grain market. Some predict that China will soon become the world's largest importer of grain.

Figures from the United States Department of Agriculture (USDA) contradict many claims that the country's wheat supply is unstable. According to USDA, in 2014 China imported 1.5 million tonnes (MT) of wheat, and had relatively small exports of 1 MT. However, China produced 126 MT of wheat in 2014, according to the same source. For comparison, Egypt was 2014's largest importer, with imports of 10.7 MT. If China had imported more than Egypt, it still would have produced almost 10 times more wheat than it imported, while in fact it produced more than 100 times more.

Russia, Ukraine and Kazakhstan
In 2022 Russia, Ukraine and Kazakhstan have restricted exports and levied tariffs on wheat.  Higher prices are not meeting any opposition from desperate buyers.

See also 

Other resource peaks

References 

Agricultural economics
Wheat